Fio Fio  is a Nigerian food peculiar to the South-Eastern part, the soup is made guinea pea and cocoyam as the major ingredients.

Origin
The guinea pea soup originates from the southeastern Nigeria and is eaten with yam or cocoyam as a local delicacy popular  in Enugu state.

It is prepared with palm oil, dried fish and ukpaka

Overview
The other ingredients in making fio fio include scent leaf, crayfish, palm oil and Ugba. Guinea pea is cooked until soft and fried alongside achicha (cocoyam paste).

See also
 Igbo cuisine
 List of African cuisine
 guinea pea

References

Nigerian cuisine
Igbo cuisine